Adolf Scherbaum (15 August 1931 – 10 March 2003) was an Austrian composer, flautist, painter and graphic artist. His entire opus, around 2000 compositions, is stored in the Music Department of the Austrian National Library in Vienna. The composer’s sister, Inge Adamiker-Scherbaum, has made his entire opus accessible to the public through a website.

Scherbaum was born in Vienna. He was one of the most prolific composers of the twentieth century, and wrote almost 2000 pieces. He died in Linz.

References

External links 
Works of and about Adolf Scherbaum SWV
Works of Adolf Scherbaum at the Austrian National Library
Audio sample

1931 births
2003 deaths
20th-century classical composers
Austrian classical composers
Musicians from Vienna
Austrian flautists
Austrian male classical composers
20th-century male musicians
Composers from Linz
Composers from Vienna
20th-century flautists